A V4 engine is a four-cylinder piston engine where the cylinders share a common crankshaft and are arranged in a V configuration.

The V4 engine is less common compared to straight-four engines. However, V4 engines have been used in automobiles, motorcycles, and other applications.

Design
Most V4 engines have two crankpins that are shared by opposing cylinders. The crankshaft is usually supported by three main bearings.

Compared to the more common inline-four engine layout, a V4 engine is much shorter. Although different V angles can be used, if the two pistons are at a 90° V-angle with shared crankpins, the engine offers the additional advantage of perfect primary balance that reduces vibration. The design can also result in a smaller rocking couple than an inline-four engine, and the shorter crankshaft is less susceptible to the effects of torsional vibration due to its increased stiffness.

Disadvantages of V4 engines include its design being inherently wider compared to inline-4 engines, as well as the requirement of two exhaust manifolds, two-cylinder heads, and two valvetrains (thus needing two or four camshafts for overhead cam engines) rather than only one cylinder head, one manifold, one valvetrain, and one or two camshafts for an inline-four engine. Having two separate banks of components increases cost and complexity.

Because V4 engines are wider than inline-four engines, incorporating auxiliary drives, inlet systems, and exhaust systems while maintaining a compact size can be more difficult. Although a 60° V4 is more compact than a 90° V4 engine, the 60° design does not have perfect primary balance (if the crankpins are not split) and, therefore, often require a balance shaft to reduce vibrations. Additionally, any (four-stroke) V4 engine with shared crankpins will fire unevenly and potentially require a heavier flywheel.

Automobile use

The earliest automotive use of V4 engines were in Grand Prix racing (later called 'Formula One') cars. One of the pioneering V4 engines was in the 1898 Mors rear-engined car built in France. At the time, the lack of vibration from the V4 engine was a key selling point. However, the car's V4 engine was replaced by a conventional inline-four engine by 1901.

In the 1907 French Grand Prix, the car entered by J. Walter Christie used a  V4 engine, the largest engine ever used in a Grand Prix race. The engine was mounted transversely in the front and the car was front-wheel drive.

The first V4 engine used in production cars was the Lancia V4 engine that was first used in the 1922 Lancia Lambda. The Lancia engine was a narrow-angle design with an angle of 20 degrees between the banks and a single cylinder head with one overhead camshaft shared by both banks. It also used aluminium for both the block and head (which was unusual for the time). Lancia produced V4 engines until 1976, when they were replaced by flat-four engines.

The 1960-1994 ZAZ Zaporozhets is a Soviet city-type car that used a rear-mounted V4 engine. This engine was based on the design used in the LuAZ-967 amphibious military vehicle.

The AMC Air-cooled 108 was a  engine built from 1960 to 1963 for use in the lightweight M422 Mighty Mite military vehicle. The M422 developed was by American Motors Corporation (AMC) in the United States and specifically designed to be transported by helicopter.

Beginning in the 1960s, Ford's European divisions produced two unrelated V4 engines. The first was the Ford Taunus V4 engine, produced in Germany from 1962 to 1981. The Taunus was a 60-degree V4 engine with water cooling and overhead valves. Initially designed for use in front-engined cars, it was used in various Ford models and also used in the front-wheel-drive Saab 95, Saab 96, and Saab Sonett models. It was also used in the mid-engine Matra 530 sports car. The second Ford V4 engine was the Ford Essex V4 engine, produced in the United Kingdom from 1965 to 1977 and used in several Ford Corsair, Capri, Consul, Zephyr, and Transit models. Although designed separately from the Taunus engine, the Essex also was a 60-degree V4 with water cooling, overhead valves, and designed for use in front-engined cars/vans.

The Porsche 919 Hybrid LMP1 racing car used in the 2014–2017 seasons used a  90-degree turbocharged V4 engine that was mid-mounted.

Motorcycle use

One of the first motorcycles powered by a V4 engine was the 1931-1935 Matchless Silver Hawk built in the United Kingdom. The Silver Hawk used a narrow-angle 16-degree V4 engine with a single cylinder head, pushrod valve actuation, and air cooling.

The 1936-1938 Puch P800 was built in Austria for both civilian and military uses. The P800 used a very wide-angle 170-degree V4 engine (therefore being close in appearance to a flat-four engine) with two cylinder heads and air cooling.

V4 engines were used during the mid-to-late 1980s, especially in transverse-engined Honda motorcycles that had a 90-degree V4 engine with water cooling.

The majority of 2020 MotoGP manufacturers chose the V4 configuration for their bikes. These include:
 Honda RC213V
 Ducati Desmosedici
 KTM RC16
 Aprilia - 90° V4 for the 2020 season

Boat use
Another use of the V4 engine is in outboard motors for boats. The V4 configuration is popular for outboard marine applications due to its short engine length.

By 1972, the same basic V4 block was producing more than double the horsepower in stock form because of the experience manufacturers gained from racing. In 1988, Yamaha introduced a  two-stroke V4 to the US market with what was called "precision blend" oil injection. Most of the outboard motors are usually two-stroke engines with a carburetor.

Other uses
In 1935, the Wisconsin Motor Manufacturing Company began producing petrol (gasoline) V4 engines for industrial, agricultural, and stationary applications, with several farm equipment manufacturers using the Wisconsin V4 engines. The company produced V4 engines until 2019.

In the mid-1940s, Turner Manufacturing in the United Kingdom produced a diesel water-cooled V4 engine for industrial and marine uses. This engine was used in the 1949-1957 Turner Yeoman of England tractor.

Mitsubishi Heavy Industries built the 4ZF, an air-cooled diesel-powered V4 engine used in the Type 73 Armored Personnel Carrier and related Japanese military vehicles since 1973.

See also 
 Flat-four engine
 Inline-four engine

References

External links

 
4